BIK Karlskoga is a Swedish ice hockey team based in Karlskoga, Sweden. They are currently playing in the second highest league in Sweden, the HockeyAllsvenskan. In 1963, the club IFK Bofors was merged with Karlskoga IF and formed KB 63 (formally IF Karlskoga/Bofors). Between 1978 and 2011 the club was known as Bofors IK, which was then changed to its current name.

Karlskoga has been a stable fixture in Sweden's second tier leagues, playing in HockeyAllsvenskan and its predecessors since 1997. They're the only team to have played all seasons of Sweden's second tier since that time, as well as the only team to have played every season of its current form, HockeyAllsvenskan.

Team history 
Founded on April 12, 1978, as Bofors IK.

Karlskoga Municipality municipal board decided to purchase the rights to the club name on December 6, 2011, thus changing its name to BIK Karlskoga.

In 1978, the club elected its first chairperson, Knut Larsson.

Season by season

References

Further reading

External links
Official homepage

Ice hockey teams in Sweden
Ice hockey teams in Örebro County
Sport in Karlskoga
Bofors
1943 establishments in Sweden
Ice hockey clubs established in 1943
HockeyAllsvenskan teams